Futbol Club Andorra Futsal, was a futsal team based in Andorra la Vella (Andorra), sports section of FC Andorra, established in 1986 and played in the Spanish futsal league system.

In July 2013, FC Andorra's chairman, François Moliné announced the shutdown of futsal section due to financial mismanagement and lack of private financial support.

Sponsors
2002–08: Butagaz
2008–11: BP
2011–12: Hotels Plaza

Season to season 

1 seasons in Primera División
16 seasons in Segunda División
2 seasons in Segunda División B

Current squad 2012/13

Notable former players
 Miguelín

References

External links 
lnfs.es profile 
Old profile at lnfs.es 

Sport in Andorra la Vella
Futsal clubs in Andorra
Futsal clubs established in 1986
Sports clubs disestablished in 2013
Futsal clubs in Spain
Expatriated football clubs
1986 establishments in Andorra
2013 disestablishments in Andorra